Sir Augustus Frederick Godson JP DL (183511 October 1906) was a British Conservative Party politician.

He was educated at King's College London and Queen's College, Oxford, and served as Member of Parliament for Kidderminster from 1886 to 1906. He was knighted in 1898.

References

1835 births
1906 deaths
Alumni of King's College London
Alumni of The Queen's College, Oxford
Conservative Party (UK) MPs for English constituencies
English justices of the peace
UK MPs 1886–1892
UK MPs 1892–1895
UK MPs 1895–1900
UK MPs 1900–1906